Welcome to Woody Creek is the 2004 album from The Nitty Gritty Dirt Band.

Critical reception

Alex Henderson of AllMusic concludes his review with, "Welcome to Woody Creek isn't as essential as the Dirt Band's best '60s and '70s recordings; nonetheless, it's a solid, respectable outing that will please die-hard fans of the veteran country-rockers."

No Depression Magazine reviews the album and says, "For Welcome To Woody Creek, which comes on the heels the third Circle disc, the five-man band got back to basics, cutting the album themselves (except for a cameo by steel guitarist Dan Dugmore). The result is a blend of country, bluegrass, folk and rock that is a microcosm of the band’s 40-year history."

Billboard Magazine writes, "The classic Nitty Gritty Dirt Band lineup convened at Jimmy Ibbotson's Unami studio in Woody Creek, Colo., to record the bulk of the veteran act's latest effort. The result is vintage Dirt."

Gus Walker begins his review of the album for True West Magazine by writing, "For almost 40 years the Nitty Gritty Dirt Band has served up a comforting roux of Country, Folk and Rock music to soothe the listener’s soul."

Country Standard Times Dan MacIntosh begins his review with, "The Woody Creek referred to in this album's title is the Colorado hometown of Nitty Gritty Dirt Band co-leader Jimmy Ibbotson, which is also where the music was recorded. Such an idyllic setting may well have inspired the warmth and friendliness of this bluegrass-tinged album."

Track listing

Personnel
Jeff Hanna – vocals, acoustic, electric, 12-string, baritone and slide guitar
Jimmy Ibbotson – vocals, acoustic guitar, mandolin, mandolo, bass and accordion
Bob Carpenter – vocals, acoustic and electric pianos, hammond organ, bass and accordion
Jimmie Fadden – harmonica and drums
John McEuen – banjo, acoustic guitar, mandolin, and fiddleSpecial guest musician'
Dan Dugmore – steel guitar on "Any Love But Our Love"

References
All information is from album liner notes, unless otherwise noted.

Nitty Gritty Dirt Band albums
2004 albums